George Washington Scott (February 22, 1889 – June 17, 1969) was an American football and track and field coach. He served as the head football coach at the Colorado School of Mines in Golden, Colorado from 1934 to 1935.

Previously, he had been a highly successful football and track coach at Fort Collins High School in Fort Collins, Colorado.

References

1889 births
1969 deaths
Black Hills State Yellow Jackets football players
Colorado College Tigers football players
Colorado Mines Orediggers football coaches
High school football coaches in Colorado
People from Rapid City, South Dakota
Players of American football from South Dakota